This is a list of the number of national parks per nation, as defined by the International Union for Conservation of Nature. Nearly 100 countries around the world have lands classified as a national park by this definition.

Note that this article links to list articles of national parks by country on Wikipedia in the "Country" column in the tables.

Africa

Asia

Europe

 By region
the Alps
the Baltics
England and Wales
Northern Ireland
Scotland

North and Central America

South America

French Guiana: see France

Oceania

Hawaii: see United States
Easter Island: see Chile

See also
 List of tourist attractions
 Nature reserve

Notes

References